Diego Garzitto (born 19 January 1950) is a French football coach and former professional player.

Career

Club career
Although born in Italy, Garzitto was raised in France, and spent his entire professional career in his adopted nation, playing as a defender for CS Louhans-Cuiseaux and AC Ajaccio.

Coaching career
After coaching in the lower-leagues of France, Garzitto took charge of the under-20 national team of Ethiopia, leaving that position in August 2001. He then took charge of the national team of Togo in July 2002, leaving two months later. After returning to French club football for a period, Garzitto took charge of Ethiopia in December 2006, resigning two months later. Garzitto later led the Congolese side TP Mazembe to the 2009 CAF Champions League title, before later coaching Moroccan side Wydad Casablanca.

He became manager of Sudanese club Al-Merrikh in December 2014. He won the 2015 Sudan Premier League and 2015 Sudan Cup, and reached the semi-finals of 2015 CAF Champions League for the first time in the club's history, only losing to the eventual champions TP Mazembe. He left the club in November 2015 due to late salary payments.

In January 2017, he came back to manage Al-Merrikh in a hope to retrieve money allegedly owed to him. In August, he became manager of Libyan club Al-Ittihad.

He became the manager of Libyan club Al-Ittihad in August 2017. He became the manager of Saint-Eloi Lupopo in April 2020.

References

External links

 Diego Garzitto Interview

1950 births
Living people
French footballers
Louhans-Cuiseaux FC players
AC Ajaccio players
Ligue 1 players
Ligue 2 players
French football managers
Louhans-Cuiseaux FC managers
Al-Ittihad Tripoli managers
Racing Besançon managers
Italian emigrants to France
Expatriate football managers in Algeria
French expatriate sportspeople in Algeria
Togo national football team managers
Ethiopia national football team managers
French expatriate sportspeople in Ethiopia
French expatriate sportspeople in Sudan
French expatriate sportspeople in Togo
French expatriate sportspeople in the Democratic Republic of the Congo
CS Constantine managers
Association football defenders
Expatriate football managers in the Democratic Republic of the Congo
Expatriate football managers in Morocco
Expatriate football managers in Sudan
Expatriate football managers in Libya
Expatriate football managers in Togo
TP Mazembe managers
Wydad AC managers
Al-Hilal Club (Omdurman) managers
Al-Merrikh SC managers
UF Mâconnais managers
FC Vaulx-en-Velin players
Botola managers